At least two United States Navy ships have borne the name Achilles, in honor of the Greek hero Achilles:

 The first  was the name briefly given to the monitor  on 15 June 1869.
 The second  was an  tank landing ship converted into an  repair ship. Initially commissioned on 30 January 1943 and decommissioned on 19 July 1946, she was sold to the Chinese. The ship received three engagement stars for her World War II service: one as LST-455 and two as Achilles (ARL-41).

United States Navy ship names